Canal Park is a baseball stadium located in Akron, Ohio, United States, that is the home of the Akron RubberDucks of the Eastern League.  The team is a double-A minor-league affiliate of the Cleveland Guardians. Opened in 1997, the stadium was designed by Populous, then known as HOK Sport, the same architectural firm that designed the Guardians' Progressive Field, which opened three years earlier. The stadium takes its name from its location adjacent to the Ohio and Erie Canal, which runs behind the left-field wall.

Features
The stadium is designed as a single deck with the concourse at the top.  Seats extend all the way from one foul pole to the other (farther than most other parks at this level), and most sections contain 20-25 rows, although they taper to as little as five in the corners.

A series of 25 luxury boxes, and the press box, covers the concourse and the top few rows of seats from first base around to third base.  The walkway down the right-field line is also covered, and contains a restaurant and the RubberDucks' team shop.  A picnic berm in left field is available for rental by groups of 24 or more.

During the 2006 Akron Aeros season, the team celebrated its 10th season in Canal Park with several events.

Aside from Akron RubberDucks baseball, Canal Park occasionally hosts special events such as local high school and college baseball and the Akron Marathon. On May 19, 2015, the RubberDucks officially announced that Canal Park will host the 2016 Eastern League All-Star Game and its associated events.

Scoreboard
In August 2006, the park completed the installation of a new 18'x25' digital scoreboard to replace the original board with light bulbs.  The new board has full color animation capacity and features a four color matrix display.  The $386,000 project was originally expected to be completed in early July.  The entire scoreboard measures 56¼'x68' and is the largest free-standing scoreboard in minor league baseball.

In January 2013, The Aeros' new management announced plans to install a new scoreboard which will be 26 ft high and 68 ft wide and would cost $1.65 million. The scoreboard was completed in time for the start of the 2013 season, as well as a new smaller outfield display board near the picnic tables.

RubberDucks baseball

Attendance
On July 24, 2015, the RubberDucks reported their largest attendance ever of 8,301.

References

External links

Akron RubberDucks
Ball Parks of the Minor Leagues

Akron RubberDucks
Akron Aeros
Sports venues in Akron, Ohio
1997 establishments in Ohio
Sports venues completed in 1997
Minor league baseball venues
Baseball venues in Ohio
Tourist attractions in Akron, Ohio
Eastern League (1938–present) ballparks